ŁKS Łódź (Łódzki Klub Sportowy Łódź) is a Polish sports club based in Łódź. They are best known for their football club but are represented in many sports such as basketball, volleyball, boxing, and in the past ice hockey, athletics, tennis, table tennis, swimming, cycling, fencing, chess, etc. The club is based at Stadion Miejski im. Władysława Króla, at Aleja Unii Lubelskiej 2 in the West of Łódź.

This article focuses on the football club. Their nickname "Rycerze Wiosny" ("Knights of Spring") was given to them due to their usually strong performance in the second round of the league, after Winter break.

History

The club was founded in 1908. It was one of the founders of the Ekstraklasa, Poland's top division. It enjoyed greatest success in the 1950s and 1990s, when it reached the podium six times, including winning the championship title in 1958 and 1997–98. It also won the Polish Cup in 1957, and reached the final in 1994.

In March 2010, the city government sold the football team to a private investor, as the city could no longer afford to support the football team, particularly after several seasons in the top level Ekstraklasa, where expenses often exceeded the ticket revenue from the club's small seating-capacity stadium.

In May 2013, at the conclusion of the second-tier 2012–13 I liga season, the private investor declared bankruptcy. The club survived when a partnership between fans and other local investors raised the necessary funds to enter the much more affordable amateur fifth-level IV liga in time for the 2013–14 IV liga season, competing against other local area teams in the Łódź group. The rebuilt club returned to the top division in 2019.

Facilities 
In 2009 the new Atlas Arena was completed adjacent to the football stadium. It is an indoor arena and has already hosted international events in basketball, volleyball and boxing.

The City council, owner of the various ŁKS Łódź sports clubs, still intend to construct a brand new stadium on the site of the current football stadium. It was intended to be complete in time for UEFA Euro 2012, but now is expected to be finished in late 2013-early 2014. Although Łódź is not a Euro 2012 host city, it had been believed that a failure by Ukraine to be ready on time would lead to Poland hosting the entire tournament on its own and therefore requiring more host cities. There were four Polish host cities (Warsaw, Gdańsk, Poznań and Wrocław) involved in hosting the tournament. It was envisioned the new stadium would have approximately 34,000 seats, as required by UEFA. While the concept of a new stadium for ŁKS Łódź was being discussed in 2009, cross-town rival Widzew Łódź announced that they would not contribute to any such stadium, as they had imminent plans to renovate their own stadium (the Widzew Łódź plans were stalled for years, eventually opening the 18,000 seat Stadion Miejski Widzewa in 2017). Support for the project was undermined by the successful re-call of the Łódź city president in early 2010. The city also announced a public auction for their stake in the club as they could no longer afford to cover the clubs loses. Owing to financial constraints and lack of demand from LKS fans, the conceptual plan for a new ŁKS Łódź stadium was scaled down to 16,500 in 2012.

As part of renovations, a new 3,000 seat arena was supposed to be built to complement the existing Atlas Arena. All work was expected to cost 218 million PLN.

All plans to provide the club with new facilities, however, were abandoned as of 2013, due to financial constraints and the bankruptcy of the club in May 2013.
However, with an upturn in the clubs fortunes, a new stadium is currently being built. One side was used during the 2019-20 Ekstraklasa season with the remainder of the ground set to be completed by 2021.

Rivalries 
The club has a fierce rivalry with cross-town club Widzew Łódź, with the derby match between the two clubs being intense both on and off the field. See Łódź derby.

Achievements 

 Ekstraklasa:
 1st Place (2): 1958, 1997–98
 2nd Place (1): 1954
 3rd Place (3): 1922, 1957, 1992–93
 Polish Cup:
 Winner (1): 1956–57
 Finalist (1): 1993–94
 Polish SuperCup:
 Finalist (2): 1994, 1998
Youth Teams:
Polish U-19 Champion: 1962, 1983, 1999
 Polish U-19 Runner-up: 1953, 1955, 1973, 2002
 Polish U-19 Bronze Medal: 1971, 1981
 Polish U-17 Champion: 1994, 1999

Current squad

Out on loan

ŁKS in Europe

Managers

 Lajos Czeizler (1923–26)
 Lajos Czeizler (1935–36)
 Władysław Król (1949)
 Jan Wiszniowski (1950)
 Edward Drabiński (1950–51)
 Artur Woźniak (1951)
 Władysław Król (1952–59)
 Kazimierz Radwański (1960)
 Stanisław Baran (1961)
 Władysław Król 
 Tadeusz Foryś (1965)
 Longin Janeczek (1966–67)
 Wacław Pegza (1968)
 Józef Walczak (1971–72)
 Paweł Kowalski (1972–)
 Kazimierz Górski (1973)
 Grzegorz Polakow (1975)
 Longin Janeczek (1976)
 Leszek Jezierski (1976–78)
 Zygmunt Małolepszy (1978)
 Józef Walczak (1980)
 Wojciech Łazarek (1991)
 Ryszard Polak (1991–95)
 Zbigniew Lepczyk (1995)
 Marek Dziuba (1996–99)
 Adam Topolski (2000)
 Włodzimierz Gąsior (2002)
 Bogusław Pietrzak (2002–03)
 Włodzimierz Tylak (2003)
 Wojciech Borecki (2003–04)
 Marek Chojnacki (2004)
 Wiesław Wojno (2005–06)
 Jerzy Kasalik (2006)
 Marek Chojnacki (2006–07)
 Wojciech Borecki (2007)
 Mirosław Jabłoński (2007–08)
 Marek Chojnacki (2008)
 Grzegorz Wesołowski (2008–10)
 Andrzej Pyrdoł (2010–11)
 Dariusz Bratkowski (2011)
 Michał Probierz (2011)
 Tomasz Wieszczycki (2011)
 Ryszard Tarasiewicz (2011–12)
 Andrzej Pyrdoł (2012)
 Marek Chojnacki (2012)
 Maciej Szpak (2013)
 Piotr Zajączkowski (2013)
 Wojciech Robaszek (2013–2014)
 Andrzej Kretek (2014) 
 Marek Chojnacki (2014–2015)
 Robert Szwarc (2015–2016)
 Wojciech Robaszek (2016)
 Marcin Pyrdoł (2016–2017)
 Wojciech Robaszek (2017–2018)
 Kazimierz Moskal (2018–2020)
 Wojciech Stawowy (2020–2021)
 Ireneusz Mamrot (2021)
 Kibu Vicuña (2021–2022)
 Marcin Pogorzała (2022)
 Kazimierz Moskal (2022–)

Notable former players

ŁKS Łódź II
As of the 2021–22 football season in Poland, the club's reserve team, ŁKS Łódź II, competes in the III liga, having won promotion from the 2020–21 IV liga.

See also 
 ŁKS Łódź (women's basketball)
 Football in Poland
 List of football teams
 UEFA Champions League
 UEFA Cup

References

External links 

 
 ŁKS Łódź at 90minut.pl
 Łódzki KS at 90minut.pl
 Unofficial website
 Atlas Arena Site
 Facebook
 Twitter
 Instagram

 
Football clubs in Łódź
Association football clubs established in 1908
1908 establishments in Poland
1908 establishments in the Russian Empire